Laguna Hills Mall was a shopping mall in Laguna Hills, California, in southern Orange County that is being redeveloped the owners as Village at Laguna Hills. The enclosed mall closed on December 31, 2018, and was completely demolished in 2023. The exterior stores remain open. A hotel, entertainment venues, apartments, office spaces and a community park will replace the mall.

History

1973 launch
The mall opened in phases starting in Spring 1973 with  Sears as the first anchor open, followed by a  two-level Buffums on September 5, 1973. The Broadway followed, opening in August 1975, and J.C. Penney in 1976.

1990s
In May 1991, Buffum's closed due to the chain being liquidated and three years later, the store's second level was converted into an upstairs food court. The food court, which operated from 1994 to 2011, was the only part of the general mall on the second level. The Broadway converted into Macy's in May 1996.

2010s
In May 2013, Merlone Geier Partners purchased the property from Simon Property Group. A year later, Merlone Geier purchased the Sears anchor store. Sears (the mall's original anchor store) closed in July 2014. Renovations started in 2016.

Re-branding

The Laguna Hills Mall is scheduled to be renamed "Five Lagunas". According to Laguna Hills' city documents, the renovations include pedestrian plazas, new retail sections, a 988-unit apartment complex, a multi-screen movie theater, new signage, and a 1,500-space parking structure.

Macy's closed in March 2018 as part of a plan to close 11 stores nationwide, which halted construction on its end of the mall and left JCPenney as the only remaining anchor.

JCPenney closed in October 2018 which left the mall with no anchors.

The mall closed on December 31, 2018. The exterior stores remained open.

Plans for Five Lagunas
At a November 2019 City Council meeting, Merlone-Geier unveiled two major changes to the previous plans proposed since 2016: adding housing and reduction of retail space. Previously, the proposal called for 880,000 square feet of retail space and 988 residential units. Another reduction was made in office space to make room for the seasonal events. The revised proposal included a new 110,000 square-foot cinema, 225,000 to 300,000 square feet of retail, a 125-room hotel, 390,000 to 520,000 square feet of office space, two three-story parking structures, and a potential of 1,200 to 1,500 more apartments.

References

Shopping malls in Orange County, California
Laguna Hills, California
Shopping malls established in 1973
Shopping malls disestablished in 2018
Mixed-use developments in California
Demolished shopping malls in the United States
1973 establishments in California
2018 disestablishments in California